Natallia Sazanovich (born 15 August 1973 in Baranavičy) is a former Belarusian heptathlete. She won two Olympic medals, and achieved her personal best score of 6563 points at the 1996 Olympics. Sazanovich is also the 2001 World Indoor champion. She also competed at the 2004 Olympics, but withdrew after two events.

Achievements

Personal bests

External links

1973 births
Living people
People from Baranavichy
Belarusian heptathletes
Athletes (track and field) at the 1996 Summer Olympics
Athletes (track and field) at the 2000 Summer Olympics
Athletes (track and field) at the 2004 Summer Olympics
Olympic silver medalists for Belarus
Olympic bronze medalists for Belarus
Sazanovich, Natalia
World Athletics Championships medalists
European Athletics Championships medalists
Olympic silver medalists in athletics (track and field)
Olympic bronze medalists in athletics (track and field)
Goodwill Games medalists in athletics
World Athletics Indoor Championships winners
Medalists at the 1996 Summer Olympics
Competitors at the 2001 Goodwill Games
Sportspeople from Brest Region